Route 298 is 40 km two-lane north/south highway in Quebec, Canada, which starts in Sainte-Luce at the junction of Route 132 and ends in Saint-Charles-Garnier. Provincial highways with even numbers usually follow the Saint Lawrence River in a somewhat east/west direction, but Route 298 is a north/south highway in almost all of its length.

Municipalities along Route 298
 Sainte-Luce
 Saint-Donat
 Saint-Gabriel-de-Rimouski
 Les Hauteurs
 Saint-Charles-Garnier

See also
 List of Quebec provincial highways

References

External links 
 Provincial Route Map (Courtesy of the Quebec Ministry of Transportation) 
 Route 298 on Google Maps

298